UIL may mean:

 UIL Holdings Corporation, a natural gas company based in Connecticut, U.S.
 UNESCO Institute for Lifelong Learning, a United Nations educational centre
 Unione Italiana del Lavoro, the Italian Labour Union
 United International Airlines, ICAO designator of a Serbian cargo airline
 United Irish League, a nationalist political party in Ireland from 1898 through the 1920s
 University Interscholastic League, the governing body for public school interscholastic activities in the US state of Texas
 User-in-the-loop, a system theoretic paradigm to change user behavior
 User Interface Language, an X11 application language used by Motif
 Uil River, a river of Kazakhstan